D51 connects A3 motorway Nova Gradiška interchange to Nova Gradiška and Požega. The road forms two junctions to D38 state road, one in Brestovac, where D38 branches off to Pakrac, and another  further east, in Požega, where D38 branches off to Pleternica. Between those two junctions D51 and D38 are concurrent. The eastern terminus of the road is near Gradište, at a junction to D53 state road to Našice (to the north) and Slavonski Brod (to the south).

The route comprises numerous junctions to county and local roads, as well as a significant number of urban intersections, in segment of the road running through Požega.

The road, as well as all other state roads in Croatia, is managed and maintained by Hrvatske ceste, a state-owned company.

The D51 state road currently serves as the principal connection of the city o Požega and the A3 motorway, however there are plans to replace it with a new expressway, that is expected to comprise a significantly altered route.

Traffic volume 

Traffic is regularly counted and reported by Hrvatske ceste, operator of the road.

Road junctions and populated areas

Sources

D051
D051
D051